Samisoni Fisilau (born 29 November 1987) in Tofoa, Tonga is a Tongan Rugby union player. He plays scrum-half for RFU Championship side Jersey Reds. He previously played for the Super Rugby franchise the Hurricanes. Fisilau played 33 matches for Counties Manukau from 2008 to 2011 before shifting north to Northland in 2012. He currently plays for Bay of Plenty. He has international experience as well with the Tonga national rugby union team.

On 13 January 2015, Fisilau moves to the UK as he signs for Jersey in the RFU Championship from the 2014–15 season.

Fisilau was released by Jersey before the RFU Championship 2017/18 season and is now a free agent.

References

External links 
 
 

1987 births
Tongan rugby union players
Tonga international rugby union players
Counties Manukau rugby union players
Northland rugby union players
Bay of Plenty rugby union players
Rugby union scrum-halves
Tongan emigrants to New Zealand
Living people
People from Tongatapu